The 15th Senate District of Wisconsin is one of 33 districts in the Wisconsin State Senate.  Located in southern Wisconsin, the district comprises western Rock County, parts of eastern and northern Green County, and southeast Dane County.  It includes the cities of Janesville, Brodhead, Edgerton, Evansville, and Stoughton, as well as the western half of the city of Beloit.

Current elected officials
Mark Spreitzer is the senator representing the 15th district since January 2023.  He previously served in the State Assembly, representing the 45th Assembly district from 2015 to 2023.  

Each Wisconsin State Senate district is composed of three Wisconsin State Assembly districts.  The 15th Senate district comprises the 43rd, 44th, and 45th Assembly districts.  The current representatives of those districts are: 
 Assembly District 43: Jenna Jacobson (D–Oregon)
 Assembly District 44: Sue S. Conley (D–Janesville)
 Assembly District 45: Clinton Anderson (D–Beloit)

The 15th Senate district, in its current borders, crosses three different congressional districts.  The portion of the district in Jefferson County, and the city of Whitewater, which is partly in Walworth County, falls within Wisconsin's 5th congressional district, which is represented by U.S. Representative Scott L. Fitzgerald; the remainder of Walworth County and the cities of Janesville and Milton and the eastern part of Rock County fall within Wisconsin's 1st congressional district, which is represented by U.S. Representative Bryan Steil; the remainder of the district, in Dane, Green, and Rock counties, falls within Wisconsin's 2nd congressional district, which is represented by U.S. Representative Mark Pocan.

Past senators
The district has previously been represented by:

Note: the boundaries of districts have changed repeatedly over history. Previous politicians of a specific numbered district have represented a completely different geographic area, due to redistricting.

References

External links
District Website

Wisconsin State Senate districts
Dane County, Wisconsin
Green County, Wisconsin
Jefferson County, Wisconsin
Rock County, Wisconsin
Walworth County, Wisconsin
1848 establishments in Wisconsin